Cesare Cremonini (born 27 March 1980) is an Italian singer-songwriter and actor.

Cremonini was the leader of Lùnapop, a successful and popular Italian pop band between 1999 and 2002. In 2002 Lùnapop was disbanded. He has since pursued a successful solo career. His Lùnapop bandmate, Nicola 'Ballo' Balestri, has joined him in his new band, along with other musicians.

The singer's biggest solo hits include "Vieni a vedere perché", "Latin Lover", "Gongi-Boy", "Marmellata #25", "Dicono di me", "Figlio di un re", "Il Comico", "Mondo", "Buon viaggio (Share The Love)", "Poetica" and "Nessuno Vuole Essere Robin". Since going solo, he has released six albums: Bagus, Maggese, 1+8+24, Il primo bacio sulla Luna, La Teoria dei Colori, Logico and Possibili Scenari. There is an additional "special edition" version of Bagus with a DVD containing extra bonus and music videos. His album Maggese was partly recorded at the famous Abbey Road Studios in London.

Discography

Albums

Studio albums

Live albums

Compilation albums

Singles

As lead artist

As featured artist

Other appearances

Filmography

Awards and nominations

References

External links
 Cesare's Homepage
 at Warner Music Italy (in Italian)

Italian  male singer-songwriters
Living people
1980 births
Italian male actors
Italian pop singers
Musicians from Bologna
21st-century Italian  male singers